Brookside, Utah is a unincorporated community located in Washington County. It is near the city of Veyo.

History 
Thomas Alfred Jeffery founded Brookside in 1902, the town was built so travelers could take a rest stop.

In 1953, the Baker Reservoir was built in the city limits to increase economy and tourism in Brookside.

References  

Unincorporated communities in Washington County, Utah